Macbeth is a live television adaptation of the William Shakespeare play presented as the November 28, 1954 episode of the American anthology series Hallmark Hall of Fame. Directed by George Schaefer, and starring Maurice Evans and Dame Judith Anderson, the production was telecast in color, but has only been preserved on black-and-white kinescope.

In 1960, Evans and Anderson starred in a filmed made-for-television production of the play, also directed by Schaefer for the Hallmark Hall of Fame, but with an entirely different supporting cast. That production was filmed in color on location in Scotland, and was released theatrically in Europe.

Cast

Maurice Evans as Macbeth
Judith Anderson as Lady Macbeth
Jane Rose as First Witch
Frieda Altman as Second Witch
Maud Sheerer as Third Witch
House Jameson as Duncan
Roger Hamilton as Malcolm
William Woodson as the Sergeant
Guy Sorel as Ross
Staats Cotsworth as Banquo
Michael Kane as Angus
Basil Langton as Seyton
John Reese as Fleance
J. Pat O'Malley as the Porter (credited as Pat O'Malley)
Richard Waring as Macduff
Peter Fernandez as Donaldbain [sic]
Noel Leslie as the Doctor
George Ebeling as First Murderer
Robert Carricart as Second Murderer
Ford Rainey as Menteith
Margot Stevenson as Lady Macduff
Rhoden Streeter as Young Macduff
Nan McFarland as Gentlewoman
Edwin Jerome as Caithness
Val Wrenne as the Servant
Roy Dean as the Messenger

References

External links
 

1954 American television episodes
Films based on Macbeth
Emmy Award-winning programs
Hallmark Hall of Fame episodes
Films directed by George Schaefer
1954 drama films
1954 films